Boubakary Sadou   (born September 7, 1982) is a Cameroonian football midfielder currently playing for Al Ahly Tripoli.

External links 
 https://www.thefinalball.com/player/boubakary_sadou/2009_2010/profile/139/default/77424

Cameroonian footballers
Living people
1982 births
Association football midfielders
Rwanda international footballers